Nileshwaram or Nileshwar or Neeleswaram is a municipality and a  major town in Kasaragod District, state of Kerala, India. It is one of the three  municipalities in Kasaragod district; the others are Kasaragod and Kanhangad. Nileshwaram is located on the estuary of Kavvayi Backwaters and Neeleshwaram River (also known as Thejaswini River). Nileshwar is referred to as the cultural capital of Kasaragod, the northernmost district, of Kerala. "The first Chief Minister of Kerala and communist leader E. M. S. Namboodiripad had contested elections to the Assembly from the Neeleswaram segment."

History

Neeleswaram, or Nileswaram, is the abbreviated form of Neelakanta Ishwaran. The  Kolathiri  Dominion  emerged  into  independent 10 principalities in the late medieval period, i.e., Kadathanadu (Vadakara), Randathara or Poyanad (Dharmadom), Kottayam (Thalassery), Nileshwaram, Iruvazhinadu (Panoor), Kurumbranad etc., under separate royal chieftains due to the outcome of internal dissensions. Many portions of the present-day Hosdurg taluk (Kanhangad) and Vellarikundu were parts of the Nileshwaram dynasty, who were relatives to both Kolathunadu as well as Zamorin of Calicut, in the early medieval period. Nileshwaram was historically the  seat of the Neeleswaram Rajahs, who belonged to the clans of the Kolathiri and Zamorins. The Nileshwar Rajahs and the Bednore Nayaks battled in this area.

The grand finale of the annual temple festival season takes place in this area, which is known for its "kavus", or sacred groves. The most famous of the sacred groves is the Mannampurathu Kavu. The town is also known for Theyyam, the ritualistic art forms. Also Nileshwar is the first town in Kerala famous for cultivating 'Chengthengu' (red dwarf coconut).

In 1918, the Rajah's High School was established, it was one of the first north Kerala schools of its kind. The school retains a letter written to the students by Mahatma Gandhi on his way in 1928 to Mangalore. It was part of a broad appeal for people to rally behind the national movement.

Administration

Nileshwar Municipality and surrounding Panchayats are administered by Nileshwar Block Panchayat. Nileshwaram is politically a part of Thrikaripur Assembly constituency under Kasaragod Loksabha constituency.

Municipal Wards 
Nileshwar Municipality is composed of following 32 wards:

Religion
Most of the people are Hindus, followed by Christians and Muslims. To a lesser extent, there are Jain and Buddhists. The name Nileshwaram is derived from the name of a temple Thaliyil Siva Temple (Neelakanteshwaran), and the culture of the town is based in large part by its temples, like Thaliyil Siva Temple, Mannam Purath Kaavu, Shri Gopalakrishna Temple and Vaikunda Temple.

Transportation 

Nileshwar Town is between Kochi and Mumbai on the National Highway. Private and KSRTC buses provide routes to many cities like Ernakulam, Calicut, Mangalore, Mysore and Bangalore. There are rail services at Nileshwar railway station. There are airports at Mangalore to the north and Kannur to the south.

See also
 Kanhangad

References

Further reading
 
 
 

Nileshwaram area
Cities and towns in Kasaragod district